Saz or SAZ may refer to:

 Sarah (given name), nickname Saz 
 Saz, Iran, a village in Kermanshah Province, Iran
 Saz, Kaynaşlı
 Saz style, a serrated leaf pattern used in Ottoman art and pottery
 Leyla Saz (1850–1936), Turkish composer, poet and writer
 Sameh Zakout, Palestinian rap artist
 Saurashtra language (ISO 639-3: saz)
 Sozialistische Arbeiter-Zeitung (SAZ), newspaper published in Germany
 Saz, a member of the bağlama family of musical instruments

See also
 Saaz (disambiguation)